Benton C Bainbridge (born January 22, 1966) is an American artist known for new media art including single channel video, interactive artworks, immersive installations and live visual performances with custom digital, analog and optical systems of his own design.

He is faculty at School of Visual Arts MFA Computer Arts department. His work is collected in the Turbulence.org collection and The "ETC: Experimental Television Center Archives" in the Rose Goldsen Media Archives at Cornell University and The Kitchen Archive at the Getty Research Institute. From 2006 to 2007, Bainbridge was Education Fellow at Eyebeam. He has since realized many projects there, including the inaugural MIXER event and VHS portraits.

His early career focused on the live creation of electronic cinema in collaboration with other artists and anticipated today's VJ collectives. Bainbridge's aesthetic technique is characterized by extensive realtime manipulation analog and digital media.  His work is presented in both art and entertainment spaces ranging from museums to stadiums.

He has shown across five continents, collaborating with artists including the Beastie Boys, Kaki King, Pauline Oliveros, V. Owen Bush, Abigail Child, Nick Didkovsky, Bobby Previte, Jin Hi Kim, Dream Theater, Barbara Held, Lonnie Holley and Tonstartssbandht,
among many others.

Bainbridge has shown his work in venues such as the Whitney Museum of American Art, Museum of Modern Art, Lincoln Center, Madison Square Garden, The Kitchen (NYC), EMPAC (Troy, NY), the American Museum of Natural History, SFMOMA (San Francisco), Hirshhorn Museum and Sculpture Garden (Washington, D.C.), Dallas Video Festival, Boston Cyberarts Festival, Eyebeam, Mercat des les Flors (Barcelona), LUX2006 (Sevilla), Auditorium Parco della Musica (Roma), Test-Portal (Amsterdam), Sonic Light (Amsterdam), Wien Modern (Vienna), Inventionen (Berlin), Teatro Colón CETC (Buenos Aires), CELCIT (Managua), Xi'an China International Horticultural Exposition 2011, Korean Festival (Seoul), Good Vibrations (Australia), and MTV Networks (global).

Bainbridge has founded and is currently focused on developing the FEED arts and media center at 1307 State Street in Erie, Pennsylvania. Previously the 50,000 sq ft building was owned by Epp Furniture company before being renovated.

Early life and education 
Bainbridge was born in Cleveland, Ohio, where his father was an electronics and computer engineer with NASA's Lewis Research Center (now Glenn Research Center) and his mother wrote, photographed and made artwork with paint and fabric. He was first exposed to abstract video art on Public Television through the analog effects of The Electric Company. Later, Bainbridge's family moved to the exurbs of Erie, Pennsylvania where he met and began making drawings, plastic sculptures and food art with Philp R. Bonner. He attended General McLane High School, in Edinboro, PA, where he began collaborating with his fellow artist students, presenting several multimedia performances in the school incorporating Super 8mm film, 35mm slides, " Reel to reel and VHS video technology, along with performers, costumes, art objects, and music. At this time, Bainbridge also made Comix, performance art, and electronic music, showing at Erie area galleries and art spaces as well as non-art venues like swimming pools and other public spaces.

After high school, Bainbridge moved to New York City and immersed himself in New York's Lower East Side art scene while studying film and TV at New York University's Tisch School of the Arts. As an undergrad, Bainbridge chose video as his primary medium and began presenting work at art spaces and clubs like Space 2B (aka "The Gas Station") and Danceteria. Working at Rafik as an engineer, editor and salesperson introduced him to many artists, personalities, ideas and esthetics. At Rafik, Bainbridge worked on projects for Robin Byrd, Richard Kern and Boogie Down Productions' "The Bridge Is Over" video.

In 1989, Bainbridge graduated from Tisch with a Bachelor in Fine Arts. That same year his short video "Betabet" was screened at Museum of Modern Art in the Film/Video Arts 21 program and he was awarded his first residency at Experimental Television Center. As part of this residency, Bainbridge began his first live video performance experiments with collaborators Philip R. "Bulk Foodveyor" Bonner, Jonathan "Naval Cassidy" Giles, Chad Strohmayer and Andrew Koontz. These early experiments convinced Bainbridge that video art can be made much as music: in real time, in collaboration, in public, via the free manipulation of all the tools of the medium.

Live visuals for Beastie Boys 
Bainbridge co-designed multichannel, realtime video for two Beastie Boys' global tours and TV appearances including nearly all of MTV Networks' channels on four continents. For the Beasties' "The Mix Up" tour, Bainbridge's video designs used RGB LED technology to play visuals on Spike Brant's (Performance Environment Design Group) giant video mobile. For Vh1, CMT and other networks, Bainbridge designed and performed video for numerous live televised performances, first VJing for Beastie Boys' 2004 MTV VMA performance and then TV appearances promoting "To the 5 Boroughs".

Select performances, exhibitions and screenings

2017

2016

2015

2014

2013

2012

2011

2010

2009

2008

2007

2006

2005

2004

2003

2002

2001

2000

1999

1995

1994

1993

KOMOTION, San Francisco. "Barriers" video installation.

1993

1992

1989

Residencies

2010

Awards

Collections

Bainbridge also curates, teaches and advises on video art and tech. For Lincoln Center's New York Video Festival, Benton C co-curated Synaesthesiologists, a festival of dozens of shorts in a feature-length overview of the global audiovisuals scene. At UAMA high school in Brooklyn, Bainbridge started the first VJ class in the U.S. public education system, going on to teach students ranging from pre-teen to post-graduate as Eyebeam Art and Technology Center's inaugural Education Fellow.

References

External links 
 Benton C Bainbridge's website
 Benton C Bainbridge's YouTube

Living people
Tisch School of the Arts alumni
American video artists
American multimedia artists
Artists from New York City
1966 births